Oakland is an unincorporated community in Oakland Township, Freeborn County, Minnesota, United States, near Albert Lea and Austin. It is along Interstate 90, County Road 46, and County Road 34 / 890th Avenue.

Climate
This area has a continental climate which is typified by large seasonal temperature differences, with warm to hot (and often humid) summers and cold (sometimes severely cold) winters.  The Köppen Climate Classification subtype for this climate is "Dfa" (Hot Summer Continental Climate).

Notes

Unincorporated communities in Freeborn County, Minnesota
Unincorporated communities in Minnesota